Dawn Euer is a Democratic member of the Rhode Island Senate, representing District 13 since September 5, 2017. She was first elected in a special election on August 22, 2017 to the upper chamber of the Rhode Island General Assembly, succeeding former State Senator  M. Teresa Paiva-Weed.

Euer won a full term in the Rhode Island Senate on November 6, 2018. Her constituency includes Jamestown and Newport, Rhode Island.

Early life and education
Euer was born on June 14, 1979. She graduated from the University of Minnesota in 2007 and earned her J.D. from Roger Williams University in 2010.

Rhode Island Senate
In 2017, Euer made her first bid for elective office when she decided to run for an open seat in the Rhode Island Senate that M. Teresa Paiva Weed had vacated.

After emerging from the special Democratic primary for District 13's vacant seat in the Rhode Island Senate on July 18, 2017, which she won with about 47 percent of the vote, Euer prevailed in the August 22 general election with just over 61 percent of the vote. She was sworn into the Rhode Island Senate on September 5, 2017 and represents Newport and Jamestown, Rhode Island. Euer was reelected to a full term in the Rhode Island Senate on November 6, 2018 with 71.6 percent of the vote.

In the Rhode Island Senate, she is Secretary of the Senate Committee on Environment and Agriculture. She is also a member of the Senate Committee on Judiciary and a member of the Senate Committee on Rules, Government Ethics and Oversight.

Electoral history

References

1979 births
Living people
Democratic Party Rhode Island state senators
Rhode Island lawyers
21st-century American lawyers
21st-century American politicians
21st-century American women politicians
Women state legislators in Rhode Island
University of Minnesota alumni
Roger Williams University alumni
Roger Williams University School of Law alumni
21st-century American women lawyers